Veerendra Basappa Patil (Kannada: ವೀರೇಂದ್ರ ಪಾಟೀಲ್; 28 February 1924 – 14 March 1997) was a senior Indian politician and was twice, the Chief Minister of Karnataka. He became Chief Minister for the first time from 1968–1971 and the second time was almost 18 years later, from 1989–1990.

Biography 
Born in a middle-class family in Chincholi in Kalaburagi district, Patil belonged to the dominant Banajiga Lingayat community. He was first made a Deputy minister for Home in the S. Nijalingappa government in 1957. He was elected several times from Chincholi assembly constituency of Gulbarga district to the Karnataka Legislative Assembly. In his youth, Patil teamed up with Ramakrishna Hegde and took control of the Congress organisation in the state on Nijalingappa's behalf. Being young and charismatic ministers in Nijalingappa cabinet, they both were referred as 'Lava-Kusha'. When he moved to federal politics, Nijalingappa chose Patil as his successor.

Patil's first innings as Chief minister lasted 33 months and 10 days. His control over the state administration dispelled the impression that he was just a dummy for his mentor, Nijalingappa, then the president of the All India Congress Committee.

It was during his tenure that the century-old Cauvery water dispute gained ground as Tamil Nadu objected to the irrigation projects in the Cauvery basin. Patil went ahead with the projects even though the Central Water Commission refused to clear them, to protect the interests of the farmers of the south Karnataka region who were heavily dependent on irrigation from Cauvery. Also, It was he who promoted the Karnataka Power Corporation and separated the state electricity board from the responsibility of generating power.

However, Patil was also charged with favouring his Lingayat (Banajiga) community. After the Congress split in 1969, Patil's Congress (O) party remained in power in the state until 1971 and crashed to a dismal defeat in the state assembly election in 1972 at the hands of Congress (I).

Later, Patil returned to the hub of state politics as chief of the Janata Party's Karnataka state unit. He was also made the sacrificial lamb in the 1978 Lok Sabha by-election in Chikmagalur which featured Indira Gandhi in the fray. Through the often acrimonious campaign, Patil, who was the candidate of the Janata Party, refused to indulge in personal attacks on Indira Gandhi. The same year, he lost his Rajya Sabha seat to Hegde. When he lost the state Janata Party presidency to H.D. Deve Gowda, Patil moved over to Indira Gandhi's Congress-I.

The twin defections of Veerendra Patil in Karnataka & Hitendra Desai in Gujarat turned around the fortunes of Congress(I), which otherwise had a spate of allegations against it. Winning election to the Lok Sabha from Bagalkot, he became Union Labour and Petroleum minister. However, he was later dropped from the Cabinet.

He won Gulbarga seat in 1984 Indian general elections by defeating Vidyadhar Guruji, a former MLA from Gurmitkal.

With none of the state congress leaders able to draw the masses, the state leadership fell onto Veerendra Patil's shoulders. As state party chief in Rajiv Gandhi's time, Patil reinvigorated the Congress in the state. The anti incumbency wave and the split in the Janata party resulted in a landslide victory for the Congress in November 1989. Veerendra Patil had led the election campaign on twin promises: Water & Transport facility to every village. Congress won 178 out of 224 MLA seats, which is its largest victory to-date (2020).

With fiscal deficit reigning high & diminishing returns, Veerendra Patil took charge at a difficult time.  He appointed M. Rajasekara Murthy as finance minister. The duo attacked the seconds liquor lobby by hiking the export duty by 10 times, from 2% to 20%. This had the dual-effect of reducing seconds-liquor consumption and also boosting the revenue of state government. It is to Patil's credit that he summoned the courage to take on the liquor lobby, at the risk of angering many benefactors of his party. He stuck to the line that his duty was first to the state and then, next to his party. This honesty proved dearly to him, though he became widely popular among the woman-folk of the state.

His efforts to streamline the administration and stem the rot in the secretariat was acclaimed by many.  However, he was felled by a stroke in October 1990 just as communal riots broke out in some parts of the state. It was widely speculated then, that the riots were engineered by Congress politicians who were keen to get rid of Patil. He was unceremoniously sacked by the then Congress President Rajiv Gandhi.

Patil never recouped after this incident. His health failed him and he decided against contesting the 1994 elections. Congress lost miserably and could not even become the main opposition party in that election.

He died on 14 March 1997 in Bangalore.

References

1924 births
1997 deaths
People from Kalaburagi district
Chief Ministers of Karnataka
Rajya Sabha members from Karnataka
India MPs 1980–1984
India MPs 1984–1989
Lok Sabha members from Karnataka
Indian National Congress (Organisation) politicians
Chief ministers from Indian National Congress
Indian National Congress politicians from Karnataka
Chief ministers from Indian National Congress (Organisation)
Commerce and Industry Ministers of India
Mysore MLAs 1957–1962
Mysore MLAs 1962–1967
Karnataka MLAs 1989–1994
Janata Party politicians